Zelyony Bor is a rural locality (a settlement) in Kargopolsky District, Arkhangelsk Oblast, Russia. The population was 153 as of 2012. There are 2 streets.

Geography 
Zelyony Bor is located 6 km north of Kargopol (the district's administrative centre) by road. Pogost is the nearest rural locality.

References 

Rural localities in Kargopolsky District